The Municipality of Mengeš is a municipality in the eastern part of the traditional region of Upper Carniola in central Slovenia. The seat of the municipality is the town of Mengeš. It is located approximately fifteen kilometers from the Slovenian capital of Ljubljana. Mengeš became a municipality in 1995.

Settlements
In addition to the municipal seat of Mengeš, the municipality also includes the settlements of Dobeno, Loka pri Mengšu, and Topole.

References

External links

Municipality of Mengeš on Geopedia
Mengeš municipal site

Menges
1995 establishments in Slovenia